The 1985–86 FIBA Korać Cup was the 15th edition of FIBA's Korać Cup basketball competition. The Italian Banco di Roma defeated the Italian Mobilgirgi Caserta in the final. Three of the final four teams were from Italy, and this was the second consecutive year in which both of the final two teams were from Italy.

First round

|}

Second round

|}

*The first leg was suspended in minute 9 (with Olympique Antibes winning 14–17) when one of the basket boards in Hagen's court was broken; although a replacement was quickly installed, it proved inadequate and the officials cancelled the game. Later, FIBA decided that the original two-legged match would be played as a single game in Antibes.

Automatically qualified to round of 16
  Divarese Varese
  Crvena zvezda
  Orthez
  Banco di Roma
  Bosna
  Breogán Caixa Galicia

Round of 16

Semi finals

|}

Finals

|}

External links
 1985–86 FIBA Korać Cup @ linguasport.com
1985–86 FIBA Korać Cup

1985–86 
1985–86 in European basketball